Domenico Poggini (1520–1590) was an Italian sculptor, engraver, medallist, goldsmith, and poet.

Poggini was born in Florence. His father Michele Poggini and brother Giampaolo Poggini were also artists. In 1556 he was appointed diecutter for the Florentine Mint. In 1588 he was appointed chief engraver at the mint in Rome by Pope Sixtus V. He died in Rome 1590. Some of his works can be seen at the British Museum.

References

Italian engravers
1520 births
1590 deaths
Italian medallists
Renaissance sculptors
16th-century Italian sculptors
Italian male sculptors
16th-century medallists